Adamantine spar is a silky brown variety of corundum. It has a hardness of 9 on the Mohs scale.

See also
Yogo sapphire

References

Aluminium minerals